Matthew Wilson (born 8 December 1998) is an Australian swimmer. He competed in the men's 50 metre breaststroke and 200 metre breaststroke events at the 2017 World Aquatics Championships and at the 100 & 200 metre breastroke at the 2019 World Aquatic Championships, winning a silver medal in the 200 m breaststroke, as well as medley relay medals on both occasions. Wilson also competed in 100 & 200 metre breastroke at the 2020 Tokyo Olympics, and formerly held the world record in the 200 metre breaststroke.

References

External links
 

1998 births
Living people
Australian male breaststroke swimmers
Place of birth missing (living people)
World Aquatics Championships medalists in swimming
Commonwealth Games medallists in swimming
Commonwealth Games gold medallists for Australia
Commonwealth Games bronze medallists for Australia
Swimmers at the 2018 Commonwealth Games
Swimmers at the 2020 Summer Olympics
Olympic swimmers of Australia
21st-century Australian people
Medallists at the 2018 Commonwealth Games